Hirachand may refer to:
Gulabchand Hirachand, Indian industrialist
Lalchand Hirachand, Indian industrialist
Ratanchand Hirachand, Indian industrialist
Walchand Hirachand, Indian industrialist
Gaurishankar Hirachand Ojha, Indian author
Dhirubhai Ambani , Indian industrialist, born Dhirajlal Hirachand Ambani

Hirachand Punumchand v Temple, court case
Seth Hirachand Mutha College, located in Maharashtra